Win Headley (born July 4, 1949) is a former American football offensive guard who played one season with the Montreal Alouettes of the Canadian Football League (CFL). He was drafted by the Green Bay Packers of the National Football League (NFL) in the eighth round of the 1971 NFL Draft. He played college football at Wake Forest University and attended Staples High School in Westport, Connecticut. Headley was also a member of the Hartford Knights of the Atlantic Coast Football League (ACFL).

Early years
Headley played high school football for the Staples High School Wreckers. He earned All-County and All-State honors as well as being selected to the New York Giants Tri-State Football Team his senior year in 1969. He also participated in wrestling, earning All-County honors and winning the state heavyweight championship in his senior season.

College career
Headley was a three-year starter at defensive tackle for the Wake Forest Demon Deacons. The Demon Deacons won their first Atlantic Coast Conference championship in 1970 as Headley was named First-team All-ACC and voted team MVP. He was also named a Second-team All-American by the Walter Camp Foundation and an All-American by the National Education Association. He was named co-recipient of the Arnold Palmer Award, which is given to Wake Forest's best male athlete, in the spring of 1971. Headley also won the Bill George Award, which is given to Wake Forest's best lineman, in 1970. He was inducted into the Wake Forest Sports Hall of Fame in 1994.

Professional career
Headley was selected by the Green Bay Packers of the NFL with the 193rd pick in the 1971 NFL Draft and converted to offensive guard. He was released before the start of the regular season. He played for the Hartford Knights of the ACFL in 1971. Headley was signed by the CFL's Montreal Alouettes in March 1972. He played in two games for the Alouettes in 1972.

Coaching career
Headley served as an assistant coach for the Winston-Salem State Rams from 1972 to 1973. He was an assistant coach with the Wake Forest Demon Deacons from 1973 to 1975. He served as an assistant coach for the Princeton Tigers from 1975 to 1982. Headley returned to coaching at the high school level in 2003 and has served as a coach at several schools, including Princeton Day School in Princeton, New Jersey and Montgomery High School in Skillman, New Jersey.

References

External links
Just Sports Stats

Living people
1949 births
American football offensive guards
American football defensive tackles
Canadian football offensive linemen
American players of Canadian football
Wake Forest Demon Deacons football players
Green Bay Packers players
Montreal Alouettes players
Winston-Salem State Rams football coaches
Wake Forest Demon Deacons football coaches
Princeton Tigers football coaches
High school football coaches in New Jersey
Players of American football from California
Players of American football from Connecticut
Sportspeople from Fairfield County, Connecticut
Sportspeople from Los Angeles County, California
People from Culver City, California
People from Westport, Connecticut
Staples High School alumni